Hasselbrook station is a railway station of the Hamburg S-Bahn  and a mainline station on the Lübeck-Hamburg railway in the area of Hasselbrook, Eilbek quarter in the German city of Hamburg.

History 
The heritage-listed entrance building was built from 1905 to 1907 as a castle-like brick building of the Gründerzeit-like style of the Hanover school of architecture by its important representative in Hamburg, the civil engineer Franz Andreas Meyer. The station is one of the last stations in Hamburg built in the style and was opened to traffic on 12 August 1907. It served as an interchange point between the Hamburg-Altonaer Stadt- und Vorortbahn (Hamburg-Altona City and Suburban railway, the predecessor of the S-Bahn) and the Lübeck-Hamburg railway. The station building, designed by the architect Eugene Goebel, was restored in the mid-1990s and is now used as a restaurant.

Layout 
The bridge next to the station was renovated in 2007 and the side walls of the station had to be cut through to make it accessible for the disabled. The signage was replaced in 2009.

The station has a two sidings, which are used only in exceptional circumstances (track closures, special trains, AKN push–pull trains).

Also located next to the former station building is a preserved bunker of the Zombeck type (a reinforced concrete cylinder with a conical roof and a step-less ramp designed to accommodate 500 people, especially at stations when trains were stopped during air raids) from the Second World War. It was established in 1941 under the then air-raid shelter program to offer passengers and passers-by protection during air raids.

S-Bahn and regional services 
The following services stop at the station:

Routes:

Gallery

Notes

External links 

 
 

Railway stations in Hamburg
Hamburg S-Bahn stations in Hamburg
Buildings and structures in Wandsbek
Hamburg Hasselbrook